The Unspeakable Chilly Gonzales is a studio album by Canadian musician and producer Chilly Gonzales. It was released on June 20, 2011, by Gentle Threat Records.

Critical reception
In a review for God Is in the TV, the album received five stars out of five, noting that it has "slick song writing at its very best." Alan Souter of The Skinny wrote: "Musically, it's typically theatrical and showy but always concise, woven together by the brazen monologues Gonzales revels in. It’s a logical and characteristically dramatic progression for the lauded nonconformist." At Drowned in Sound, Adam Boult said: "Never one to stick rigidly to convention, on The Unspeakable... the Canadian has aimed to create something pretty rare. Over a nine-song, sub-30 minute runtime there are no beats and not much bass to speak of."

Writing for Clash Magazine, critic reviewer Emily Anderton said: "Booming kettledrums, delicate pianos and dramatic violins support rhymes chocca with wit, sincerity, pop culture and self-depreciation. An impressive album, but the main impact is almost certainly in the live incendiary, incisive and ego drenched show."

Track listing

References

External links
 
 

2011 albums
Chilly Gonzales albums